Kemps Mill is an unincorporated community and census-designated place in Washington County, Maryland, United States. Its population was 126 as of the 2010 census. It is named after a 1739 built mill structure which still stands in 2020 and has operated under a variety of names through almost three centuries.  The mill dam creates a slackwater which is popular for fishing and other recreational water activities. The mill is several miles above the mouth of the Conococheague Creek which flows to the Potomac River at a location where Native American trading posts existed for many centuries prior to European settlement in the area.

Geography

Demographics

References

Unincorporated communities in Washington County, Maryland
Unincorporated communities in Maryland
Census-designated places in Washington County, Maryland
Census-designated places in Maryland